Sanilac Broadcasting and GB Broadcasting own and operate three radio stations in Sanilac County, Michigan, and are local ABC affiliates. They are:
WMIC 660 AM, Sandusky, The Thumb's Information Station. 
WTGV 97.7 FM, Sandusky, Light & Easy Listening
WBGV 92.5 FM, Marlette, Country 92.5 "Today's Best Country"

Sanilac Broadcasting Company
WMIC and WTGV-FM are owned by Sanilac Broadcasting Company, of Sandusky. WMIC signed on at AM 1560 in 1968 and later changed to AM 660 in 1987. WMIC has a news/talk daytime programming and country mornings and nights. WTGV began broadcasting in 1971 as WMIC-FM, and became WTGV in 1979. WTGV originally broadcast a beautiful music/easy listening format which has been updated over the years to mainstream soft adult contemporary.

WMIC is the principal station for Sanilac/GB Broadcasting, and produces news reports for WTGV and WBGV. Sanilac Broadcasting's General Manager is Bob Armstrong. Sanilac Broadcasting was founded by George Benko and Robert Benko, and it broadcasts from studios on South Elk Street in Downtown Sandusky. The stations serve the Thumb and Blue Water Area of Michigan, and WMIC's slogan is "The Thumb's Information Station", showing the station's commitment to local news. WMIC broadcasts with only 1,000 watts of power, but due to its low dial position, it can be heard easily in most of east-central and southeastern lower Michigan and southwestern Ontario.

GB Broadcasting Company
WBGV is an ABC Radio "Today's Best Country" (formerly "The Best Country Around") station, owned by GB Broadcasting. GB's President is George Benko V, and Country 92.5 signed on in 1999. WBGV is the only station completely owned by GB Broadcasting, and is licensed to the city of Marlette, Michigan

Notes

External links
Sanilac Broadcasting-Home
Country 92.5

Sanilac County, Michigan
Radio broadcasting companies of the United States
Mass media in Michigan
Companies based in Michigan